The Imperial German railways (Reichseisenbahnen) allocated various steam locomotives in Alsace-Lorraine to the P 1 class of engines as follows:

Classification system from 1906/1912
Alsace-Lorraine B 1
Alsace-Lorraine B 2
Alsace-Lorraine B 3
Alsace-Lorraine B 4

See also
 Imperial Railways in Alsace-Lorraine
 List of Alsace-Lorraine locomotives

0-4-0 locomotives
P 1
Standard gauge locomotives of France
Standard gauge locomotives of Germany